Christian Prosenik (born 7 June 1968) is a retired Austrian football midfielder and a football manager.

Personal
Christian Prosenik is the father of professional football player Philipp.

References

External links

 Christian Prosenik Interview

1968 births
Living people
Austrian people of Slovenian descent
Association football midfielders
Austrian footballers
Austria international footballers
FK Austria Wien players
FC Red Bull Salzburg players
SK Rapid Wien players
TSV 1860 Munich players
First Vienna FC players
Austrian Football Bundesliga players
Bundesliga players
Austrian football managers
1. Simmeringer SC managers
Floridsdorfer AC managers